The Bugatti Type 32, commonly called the Tank de Tours, was a streamlined racing car built in 1923. It was built to compete in the
French Grand Prix, which was held on July 2 in Tours on the same year.

The nickname of the car comes from its particular shape, which resembles battle tanks of its era, as well as the location of the Grand Prix. Another Bugatti model that earned the nickname "Tank" for its design and aerodynamics was the 57G Tank from 1936.

Overview

Designed especially for the 1923 French Grand Prix in Tours, this original car by Ettore Bugatti was designed to be simple and quickly assembled.

The first prototype with an aerodynamic aluminium body was built in six months around the 1,991cc in-line 8-cylinder engine used in prior Bugatti Type 30. The engine rated 90 hp for the competition and weighted for approximately 650 kg.

Design
Compared to the previous competition model, the Type 29. the Type 32 only shared the motorization with the previous model.

Type 32 was small in size, with a wheelbase of 1,994m, like the Bugatti Type 13. 5 models of Type 32 were produced. In addition to the prototype, four racing capable cars were made,

Each model came with the 2.0 L (1991 cc/121 in³) straight-8 engine based on that in the Type 30.
It was a longitudinal engine with 8 cylinders in line and 5 five bearings with main bearings on the crankshaft.  It had 3 valves per cylinder, two intake and one discharge, operated by a single camshaft
Brakes hydraulically actuated at the front and mechanically actuated (metal cable) at the rear.

The Type 32 was the first Bugatti to be fitted with roller-bearing big ends in order to improve the bottom-end reliability.

The Type 32 also broke new ground (for a racing Bug) by using a three-speed and reverse transaxle unit, the exceptionally short wheelbase and long straight-8 engine making a conventional gearbox difficult to accommodate. It also heralded a hydraulic front brake actuation.

Despite the low center of gravity, its grip on the road was not good. The reason for this was due to its aerodynamics being similar to that of a wing profile, which meant that the vehicle could tend to rise at high speeds. Also, its short wheelbase contributed to the problem.

Specifications
 Track: 41.4 in (1052 mm)
 Power: 90 hp (67 kW)

Racing and legacy
4 race-capable cars were built for the 1923 French Grand Prix. The following Type 32 participated at the Tours race:
 No. 6, with Ernest Friderich, who finished third at the finish
 No. 18, driven by the Prince of Cystria, retired on lap 12
 No. 11, driven by Pierre de Vizcaya, retired at the start after an accident
 No. 16, driven by Pierre Marco, retired on the third lap3

During the race, the Type 32 reached the top speed of 180 km / h on the main straight. The French GP was Type 32's only GP race. However, for example the No. 6 (chassis No. 4059) was acquired by Mr. Junek from Czechoslovakia, who was racing with the car for the rest of 1923 and won for example the 3rd hill climb Schöberbergrennen. 

Type 32 was replaced by the brand's most successful model in racing, the Bugatti Type 35.

Another tank-bodied Bugatti racer, the 1936 Type 57G, was much more successful.

Notes

References

32
Grand Prix cars